The Baukungri Hajw Gakhwnai or Trekking of Baukungri Hill is an adventurous event held annually in Kokrajhar, Bodoland. It is organised every year on first day of the year according to Bodo calendar which falls in mid April.

History
Celebrated on a day before Bwisagu by the Bodo people the tourism department of BTC has taken up to celebrate the traditional customs as annual festival since the last five years in a grand way, by introducing various programmes and adventurous sports to attract tourists from outside or in other words through systematic and organised way.

Though it was celebrated by the Bodos in a traditional way in earlier times, in present times, thousands of people, irrespective of caste, creed and religions, throng and climb the Baukungri peak with festivity mood for welcoming the Bwisagu festival.

Events
The events typically include trekking of the Baukungri Hill, an ethnic food festival, a cultural show, and adventurous and indigenous sports.

Tourists
International tourists from neighbouring countries and western countries can be seen participating in the event.

References

Annual events in India